Caloria quatrefagesi is a species of sea slug, an aeolid nudibranch, a marine gastropod mollusc in the family Facelinidae.

Taxonomy
Caloria elegans is morphologically very similar to Facelina quatrefagesi. Facelina quatrefagesi was considered as a synonym of Caloria elegans, but a combination of DNA evidence and morphological comparison resulted in them being recognised as separate valid species. The species was transferred to the genus Caloria in 2021.

Distribution
This species was described from the Rade de Villefranche-sur-Mer, France.

Description 
The typical adult size of this species is 15 mm.

References 

Facelinidae
Gastropods described in 1888